Jody Jeremy Nunley (September 19, 1971 – February 5, 2018) was an American football defensive tackle. After a college career at Alabama, he spent three seasons in the National Football League.

Personal life and death
Nunley was born to Jody and Edith Nunley in Tullahoma, Tennessee on September 19, 1971. Nunley was a national champion athlete at the University of Alabama and a professional football player in the National Football League. Nunley had two daughters, Karsyn and Raegan, who both attended the University of Alabama, with his wife, Marti Watson, who was a student-athlete on the 1991 National Championship Gymnastics team. 

Nunley died suddenly of unknown causes  at his home on February 5, 2018, at the age of 46.

References 

1971 births
2018 deaths
People from Winchester, Tennessee
Players of American football from Tennessee
American football defensive ends
Alabama Crimson Tide football players
Houston Oilers players
Carolina Panthers players